Robert Owen is a former British slalom canoeist who competed in the 1980s.

He won two medals in the C-2 team event at the ICF Canoe Slalom World Championships with a gold in 1981 and a bronze in 1983.

References
Overview of athlete's results at canoeslalom.net

British male canoeists
Living people
Year of birth missing (living people)
Place of birth missing (living people)
Medalists at the ICF Canoe Slalom World Championships